Regina Transit is the public transportation agency operated by the City of Regina, Saskatchewan, Canada. It is the oldest public transit system in Saskatchewan and has been city-owned since its inception.

History

The "Dirty Thirties" saw huge deficits resulting in major cut-backs in service. With a shortage of gasoline and steel during World War II, streetcar ridership grew dramatically. The 32 streetcars used in 1945 carried 9,000,000 more passengers than they did in 1940. An important event in the system's history was a fire in its "bus barn" on January 23, 1949 that destroyed 17 trolley coaches, nine gasoline buses, five steel streetcars and nine wooden cars. On September 5, 1950 The last streetcar made its final run through the streets of Regina and the Regina Municipal Railway became the Regina Transit System. Regina Transit provided trolley bus service from 1947 to 1966 using Canada Car and Foundry Brill trolley buses. Since 1955, its preferred transit fleet has been buses because their freedom from overhead lines makes them suitable for detours and charters. An innovation in the early 1970s was its Telebus service, which used a telephone/radio dispatching system to send buses to individual homes. This service ended in the early 1980s because of its high cost. In 2008 Regina Transit adopted three new express route centred on the university, cutting bus trip time by up to 20 minutes. On April 10, 2013 the city of Regina approved a major route network change.

Routes

Regular service

Regina Transit operates 21 routes on weekdays, 12 routes on Saturdays and 9 routes on Sunday with statutory holidays following Sunday schedule 
 1 Dieppe/Broad North
 2 Argyle Park/Wood Meadows
 3 University/Sherwood Estates
 4 Hillsdale/Walsh Acres 
 5 Uplands/Downtown
 6 Westhill/Ross Industrial
 7 Glencairn/Whitmore Park 
 8 Eastview/Normandy Heights
 9 Parkridge/Albert Park
 10 Normanview/RCMP
 12 Varsity Park/Mount Royal
 15 Heritage
 16 Lakeridge/Hawkstone
 17 Mapleridge
 18 University/Harbour Landing
 21 University/Glencairn
 22 University/Arcola East
 30 University/Rochdale Express
 40 Albert Street Express
 50 Victoria East Express/Victoria Downtown Express
 60 Arcola East Express/Arcola Downtown Express

Mosaic Stadium shuttle 
Regina Transit offers free shuttle bus service to Mosaic Stadium during major events held at the stadium, including Saskatchewan Roughriders football games.

High School Special

Regina transit offers a service for students travelling to LeBoldus, Campbell Collegiate, Balfour Collegiate, Miller Comprehensive, Sheldon Williams Collegiate, Winston Knoll and Riffel high schools. Routes 51, 53, 56, 58, and 59 (labeled as Special 1, Special 3, Special 6, Special 8, and Special 9) operate once in the morning and once in the afternoon. These routes are operated in the same ways as the regular Regina Transit services, except for the fact that students must flag the bus down in areas not covered by mainline service.

Bus fleet

Regina Transit's fleet consists mostly of Nova Buses, with a few Vicinity operating on less-busy routes. As of 2014, all buses in the Regina Transit fleet are at least partially low-floored, as all high-floor buses were retired around that time.

NovaBus Fleet
The Nova Bus fleet is the backbone of Regina Transit's fleet, consisting of Nova Bus LFS buses. Buses built in 1998-99 were originally built for CATS and were numbered 801-809 and are now retired. Buses built in 1996-1998 were originally built for STM are also retired and were moved to Saskatoon Transit. Buses manufactured between 2005-2019 are numbered 598-665 and 667-699 and 812-836.

Vicinity Fleet
The Vicinity fleet is used on less-busy routes, such as Route 15 - Heritage, as they have less capacity. Currently only 3 buses are in the fleet, numbered 708, 709 and 710. The buses were built in 2017.

Paratransit Services
Regina Transit operates a charter bus service and a 33-fleet paratransit service for residents who cannot use the regular transit system. Regina Transit Services has been working with the Saskatchewan Human Rights Commission to improve accessibility and inclusivity of public transportation since 2013. The SHRC recognized the work of the City of Regina in 2016. Part of that work includes the introduction of low-floor accessible buses and installation of audible stop announcements. Regina Transit continues to improve the accessibility of its services.

References

External links

 Official Regina Transit website
Regina Transit - Online Trip Planner
Tom's North American Trolleybus Pix - Regina
Bus photos
More bus photos
David A. Wyatt - Transit History of Regina

Transport in Regina, Saskatchewan
Transit agencies in Saskatchewan
Bus transport in Saskatchewan